Sudan University of Science and Technology (abbreviated SUST) is one of the largest public universities in Sudan, with ten campuses in Khartoum state. The main campus is located in the so-called Al Mugran area of Khartoum, the confluence of the White Nile and the Blue Nile.

History
SUST was founded in colonial Sudan as the Khartoum Technical School and School of Commerce in 1902. Later, the School of Radiology (1932) and School of Design (1946) and School of Commerce merged with the Khartoum Technical School to form the Khartoum Technical Institute (KTI) in 1950.

The Shambat Institute of Agriculture (1954), Khartoum Senior Trade School (1962), Institute of Music and Drama and the Higher Institute of Physical Education (1969) were also added and renamed as Khartoum Polytechnic Institute (KP) in 1975. In 1990, this became the Sudan University of Science and Technology.

Colleges and Schools 

College of Graduate Studies
College of Engineering 
College of Petroleum Engineering and Technology
College of Water and Environmental Engineering
College of Industries Engineering and Technology
College of Architecture and Planning
College of Computer Science and Information Technology
College of Medicine
College of Dentistry 
College of Pharmacy
College of Medical Laboratories Science
College of Medical Radiologic Sciences

College of Science
College of Agricultural Studies
College of Veterinary Medicine
College of Animal Production Science and Technology
College of Forestry and Range Science
College of Business Studies
College of Languages
College of Education
College of Fine and Applied Arts
College of Music and Drama
College of Physical Education and Sports
College of Communication Science 
College of Technology

Campuses
SUST has 10 campuses located in Khartoum, the capital and largest city of Sudan, as well as in Khartoum State. The main campus is located in Al Mugran area of Khartoum.

Facilities

Libraries 
SUST libraries are part of each campus and managed by the Deanship of Libraries Affairs. The Libraries’ collection includes books, eBooks, print and electronic holdings of scholarly journal subscriptions, microforms, music recordings, a sizable map collection and a documentary department. In particular, SUST libraries include 12 distinct facilities:

Library of Veterinary Medicine and Animal Production 
Library of Agricultural Studies 
Library of Forestry and Range Science 
Library of Engineering 
Library of Industrial Engineering 
Library of Medical Radiological Sciences
Library of Water Science and Technology 
Library of Physical Education 
Library of Petroleum Engineering and Technology 
Library of Communication Science 
Library of Computer Science and Information Technology
Library of Medical Sciences

Also, SUST has a distinguished digital repository.

Sports facilities 
SUST is home to the only college for physical education and sports in Sudan. Many of these facilities are available to students, staff and members of the public.

Rankings

SUST ranked first of Sudanese universities in Webometrics classification of international universities and institutes successively in July 2021  
and in January 2022

SUST has been listed in the eighteenth QS World University Rankings in May 2021.

In May 2021, SUST ranked first among Sudanese universities in May 2021 edition of Webometrics rankings of digital repositories, where it ranked 190 out of 4,403 institutional repositories and ranked 205 out of 4,579 repositories globally.

UNESCO Chair  
The university hosts the UNESCO Chair for Women in Science and Technology

, which was established at the initiative of Prof. Fatima Abdel Mahmoud, who later became the first chairholder.

Notable people

Notable academics
Elfatih Hussien: Sudanese musician, author and critic. One of the pillars of music in Sudan and dean of the college of music and drama
Abdul Hakim Al-Taher: Sudanese theater director and actor
Faisal Ahmed Saad: Sudanese theater actor and comedian.

Notable alumni 
Abdel Aziz El Mubarak: Sudanese singer
Afaf Al-Sadiq: Sudanese poet, journalist, and academic
Ali Madhi Nouri: Sudanese actor, stage director who was designated UNESCO Artist for Peace in October 2012  
Ashraf Al-Dabain: Jordanian writer and novelist
Hadi Mohamed Ahmed Eltigani: Sudanese professor, Quality and corporate excellence expert, twice winner of the Harrington-Ishikawa Professional Medal and awarded the President’s Award for Demonstrated Excellence by Asia Pacific Quality Organization (APQO) 
Kamala Ibrahim Ishaq: Sudanese artist
Mazahir Salih: Sudanese-American Community activist and Iowa City Councilmember 
Saeed Zaki: Sudanese communication analyst, diplomat, the first appointed youth ambassador for the Republic of Sudan by the International Olympic Committee (IOC)  
Stephen Dhieu Dau:  South Sudanese politician, banker, first Minister of Petroleum and Mining in South Sudan
Taysir El Nourani: Sudanese minister of Labour and Administrative Reform of Sudan

Affiliations with international universities

 Multimedia University, Malaysia
 Limkokwing University of Creative Technology, Malaysia
 International Centre for Theoretical Physics (ICTP), Italy
 Norwegian University of Science and Technology
 University of Tromsø, Norway
 University of Oslo, Norway
 University of Tennessee, United States
 Boston University, U.S.
 California Institute of Technology, U.S.

Accreditation 
African Quality Rating Mechanism (AQRM), 2017 
Ministry of Higher Education and Scientific Research, Sudan
World Textile University Alliance 
 Association of African Universities (AUU)
Educause Membership for International Institutions

References

External links 
  The official website for Sudan University of Science and Technology
 Sudan University students and graduates community forum Sudanet.info website made to connect all Sudanese university students and grads together and benefit all students by providing lectures, e-books and access to email
Sudan Virtual Engineering Library website Sudan virtual library

 
National universities
Universities and colleges in Sudan
Science and technology in Sudan
Scientific organisations based in Sudan
Forestry education
Veterinary schools
Educational institutions established in 1932
Education in Khartoum
1932 establishments in the British Empire